Jeffersonville is a village in the town of Cambridge, Vermont, United States. The population was 750 at the 2020 census.

History
The village was originally called "Cambridge Center". The name was changed to "Jeffersonville" in 1827 to honor Thomas Jefferson. The village was incorporated in 1897.

Geography
The village is located near the geographic center of the town of Cambridge, along the south bank of the Lamoille River where it is joined by the Brewster River.

Climate

Jeffersonville has a humid continental climate (Köppen Dfb), with very cold winters and warm, humid summers. The annual precipitation is significant, averaging  and is well-distributed throughout the year, but the latter months are the wettest.

Demographics

As of the census of 2000, there were 568 people, 248 households, and 150 families residing in the village. There were 254 housing units at an average density of 319.4/sq mi (122.6/km2). The racial makeup of the village was 98.06% White, and 1.94% from two or more races. Hispanic or Latino of any race were 0.88% of the population.

There were 248 households, out of which 29.4% had children under the age of 18 living with them, 48.4% were married couples living together, 8.9% had a female householder with no husband present, and 39.5% were non-families. 29.0% of all households were made up of individuals, and 11.7% had someone living alone who was 65 years of age or older. The average household size was 2.29 and the average family size was 2.85.

In the village, the population was spread out, with 23.8% under the age of 18, 9.7% from 18 to 24, 35.2% from 25 to 44, 20.6% from 45 to 64, and 10.7% who were 65 years of age or older. The median age was 32 years. For every 100 females, there were 97.2 males. For every 100 females age 18 and over, there were 95.0 males.

The median income for a household in the village was $38,333, and the median income for a family was $48,929. Males had a median income of $35,375 versus $23,036 for females. The per capita income for the village was $20,323. About 1.3% of families and 6.6% of the population were below the poverty line, including 3.2% of those under age 18 and 17.6% of those age 65 or over.

Education
Students in public school Pre-Kindergarten through sixth grade attend Cambridge Elementary School in Jeffersonville, VT (318 students).
For grades 7 - 8, public school students attend Lamoille Union Middle School in Hyde Park, VT (274 students).
For grades 9 - 12, public school students attend Lamoille Union High School in Hyde Park, VT (601 students).

Sites of interest

Notable people 

 Scott Buchanan, educator, philosopher, and foundation consultant; raised in Jeffersonville
 Barbara J. Sindall, Latin and Greek teacher, World War II gunner

References

External links 

Incorporated villages in Vermont
 Jeffersonville
Villages in Lamoille County, Vermont